Benoit Piessens (10 April 1913 – ?) was a Belgian rower. He competed at the 1948 Summer Olympics in London with the men's double sculls where they were eliminated in the semi-final.

References

1913 births
Year of death missing
Belgian male rowers
Olympic rowers of Belgium
Rowers at the 1948 Summer Olympics
European Rowing Championships medalists